Vostok Watch Makers, Inc. (literally meaning "East") is a Russian watchmaker based in Chistopol, Tatarstan, Russia. The company produces mainly rugged military and amfibia mechanical watches. It also makes clocks and watch movements for other watch brands.

History

The Vostok Watch Makers company was founded in 1942 when one of the Moscow watch-making plants of the First Moscow Watch Factory was evacuated to Chistopol, a small town located on the Kama River in Tatarstan. Only defence equipment was produced during the war years, but as soon as the war was over, the company started making mechanical wristwatches. In 2006, Vostok Watch Makers began marketing another line of watches branded "Amphibia".

Despite the introduction of the new lines of Komandirskie and Amphibia, the "classic" models (mostly designed in the 1960s and 1970s) of these lines were still in production (as of 2021).

List of Vostok movements
Vostok produces its own mechanical movements. The company also owns "Briolet", which specializes in producing technical ruby-jewels.

The models produced are listed in the table below. Movement codes are based on the standard Soviet-era system.

See also
 Amfibia
 Poljot
 Raketa
 Pobeda

Notes

 Vostok history

External links

Soviet watch brands
Russian brands
Watch movement manufacturers
Watch manufacturing companies of the Soviet Union
Watch manufacturing companies of Russia
Companies based in Tatarstan